The Winnemucca Indian Colony of Nevada is a federally recognized tribe of Western Shoshone and Northern Paiute Indians in northwestern Nevada.

Reservation
In 1990, 17 tribal members lived on the reservation. In 2022, a court filing reported that the colony consisted of 28 tribal members.

Recent history
In 2007, the Winnemucca Indian Colony joined non-Natives from Utah in suing the United States to prevent the detonation of 700 tons of explosives at the Nevada Test Site, which is on ancestral Western Shoshone lands. In the 1940s, members of the tribe had been forcibly removed from their lands, which were taken over by the Nevada Test Site, where nuclear bombs were tested from 1951 to 1993. The tribe considers the removal and subsequent nuclear weapons testing on their lands as a violation of the 1863 Western Shoshone Treaty of Ruby Valley.  The test, called Divine Strake, was eventually cancelled.

The Committee on the Elimination of Racial Discrimination of the United Nations High Commission on Human Rights ruled on March 10, 2006 that the lands belonged to the Winnemucca Indian Colony and other Western Shoshone tribes. The USA does not recognise the competence of the Committee to hear complaints from individuals about violations of the rights protected by the Convention on the Elimination of Racial Discrimination.

Today
The Winnemucca Indian Colony of Nevada's tribal headquarters is located in Winnemucca, Nevada. Judy Rojo is the Tribal Chairman recognized by the federal Bureau of Indian Affairs. The tribe is governed by a five-person tribal council.

Notable Winnemucca
Chief Winnemucca
Sarah Winnemucca, she published the first autobiography by a Native American woman, Life Among the Paiutes: Their Wrongs and Claims (1883), considered "one of the most enduring ethno-historical books written by an American Indian."

Notes

References
 Pritzker, Barry M. A Native American Encyclopedia: History, Culture, and Peoples.'' Oxford: Oxford University Press, 2000. .
 "Tribal Leaders Directory: 2014 Fall/Winter Edition" Bureau of Indian Affairs, 2015, .

Northern Paiute
Western Shoshone
American Indian reservations in Nevada
Native American tribes in Nevada
Winnemucca, Nevada
Geography of Humboldt County, Nevada
History of Humboldt County, Nevada
Federally recognized tribes in the United States